The Porretta Soul Festival  is a soul music festival that takes place on the third week of July in the Rufus Thomas Park in Porretta Terme, province of Bologna.

History
The festival was founded on December 10, 1987 by Graziano Uliani, a passionate soul music fan. After attending an event commemorating the twentieth anniversary of the death of Otis Redding in Macon, Georgia, Uliani decided to dedicate a festival in his honour.

Since the time of its inception, Uliani has been able to bring to Porretta some most of the major soul acts in the world.
Porretta now has a street dedicated to Otis Redding and the park where the Festival is held is named after Rufus Thomas. After more than thirty years, the Porretta Soul Festival is a stable feature on the geography of soul music and is considered the European showcase of the Memphis Sound. The festival has official links  with the Stax Museum of American Soul Music in Memphis and the Center For Southern Folklore in Memphis.

Artists
Artists who performed at the Porretta Soul Festival include Rufus and Carla Thomas, Bobby Manuel & the Memphis All Stars with Marvell and Vaneese Thomas, Solomon Burke, Howard Tate, Isaac Hayes, Wilson Pickett, Percy Sledge, Sam Moore, Irma Thomas, The Memphis Horns, LaVern Baker, Mighty Sam McClain and Peter Giftos, Millie Jackson, Otis Clay, Ann Peebles, Mavis Staples, Booker T. & the M.G.s, The Neville Brothers, Chaka Khan, Sugar Pie DeSanto, Joe Simon, Mable John, The Bar-Kays, Harvey Scales, The Bo-Keys and Betty Harris.

References

External links
Official website
An Interview with Graziano Uliani in July 2013 at Soul Express

Music festivals in Italy